The 17th National Congress of the People's Party was held in Seville from 17 to 19 February 2012, to renovate the governing bodies of the People's Party (PP) and establish the party's main lines of action and strategy for the next leadership term. The congress slogan was "Committed to Spain", and it saw Mariano Rajoy, incumbent prime minister of Spain as a result of the PP victory at the 2011 Spanish general election, being re-elected unopposed for a third term as party president with 97.6% of the delegate vote in the congress (2,525 votes) and 2.4% of blank ballots (63).

Overview
The congress of the PP was the party's supreme body, and could be of either ordinary or extraordinary nature, depending on whether it was held following the natural end of its term or due to any other exceptional circumstances not linked to this event. Ordinary congresses were to be held every three years and called at least two months in advance of their celebration. Extraordinary congresses had to be called by a two-thirds majority of the Board of Directors at least one-and-a-half month in advance of their celebration, though in cases of "exceptional urgency" this deadline could be reduced to thirty days.

The president of the PP was the party's head and the person holding the party's political and legal representation, and presided over its board of directors and executive committee, which were the party's maximum directive, governing and administration bodies between congresses. The election of the PP president was based on an indirect system, with party members voting for delegates who would, in turn, elect the president. Any party member was eligible for the post of party president, on the condition that they were up to date with the payment of party fees and that they were able to secure the signed endorsements of at least 100 party members and of 20% of congress delegates.

Timetable
The key dates are listed below (all times are CET. Note that the Canary Islands use WET (UTC+0) instead):

12 December: Official announcement of the congress.
19–20 January: Election of congress delegates.
17–19 February: Party congress.

Candidates

Declined
The individuals in this section were the subject of speculation about their possible candidacy, but publicly denied or recanted interest in running:

Esperanza Aguirre (age ) — President of the PP of the Community of Madrid (since 2004); President of the Community of Madrid (since 2003); Deputy in the Assembly of Madrid (since 2003); Spokesperson of the PP Group in the Assembly of Madrid (2003); Senator in the Cortes Generales for Madrid (1996–2003); President of the Senate of Spain (1999–2002); Minister of Education and Culture of Spain (1996–1999); First Deputy Mayor of Madrid (1995–1996); Spokesperson of the PP Group in the City Council of Madrid (1995–1996); City Councillor of Madrid (1983–1996).
Alberto Ruiz-Gallardón (age ) — Minister of Justice (2011–2014); Deputy in the Cortes Generales for Madrid (2011–2014); Mayor of Madrid (2003–2011); City Councillor of Madrid (1983–1987 and 2003–2011); President of the Community of Madrid (1995–2003); Deputy in the Assembly of Madrid (1987–2003); Spokesperson of the PP Group in the Senate of Spain (1993–1995); Senator in the Cortes Generales appointed by the Assembly of Madrid (1987–1995); Spokesperson of the AP/PP Group in the Assembly of Madrid (1987–1993); Vice President of AP (1987–1989); Secretary-General of AP (1986–1987).
Rodrigo Rato (age ) — Managing Director of the International Monetary Fund (2004–2007); First Deputy Prime Minister of Spain (2003–2004); Vice Secretary-General of the PP (1996–2004); Deputy in the Cortes Generales for Cádiz and Madrid (1982–2004); Second Deputy Prime Minister for Economic Affairs of Spain (2000–2003); Minister of Economy of Spain (2000–2003); Second Deputy Prime Minister of Spain (1996–2000); Minister of Economy and Finance of Spain (1996–2000); Spokesperson of the PP Group in the Congress of Deputies (1989–1996).

Opinion polls
Poll results are listed in the tables below in reverse chronological order, showing the most recent first, and using the date the survey's fieldwork was done, as opposed to the date of publication. If such date is unknown, the date of publication is given instead. The highest percentage figure in each polling survey is displayed in bold, and the background shaded in the candidate's colour. In the instance of a tie, the figures with the highest percentages are shaded.

PP voters

Spanish voters

Results

References
Opinion poll sources

Other

Political party assemblies in Spain
People's Party (Spain)
Political party leadership elections in Spain
2012 conferences